"Reverence" is a song by Scottish alternative rock group the Jesus and Mary Chain, released as the first single from the group's fourth studio album, Honey's Dead (1992). It was released by Blanco y Negro Records on 3 February 1992 and reached number 10 on the UK Single Chart and number 21 in Ireland. BBC TV banned the song from airing due to the lyrics "I want to die just like Jesus Christ / I want to die just like J-F-K", but it was not banned from BBC Radio One.

Track listings
All tracks were written by Jim Reid and William Reid, except where noted.

7-inch (NEG55) and cassette (NEG55C)
 "Reverence" – 3:45
 "Heat" – 3:00

12-inch (NEG55T) and CD single (NEG55CD)
 "Reverence" – 3:45
 "Heat" – 3:00
 "Reverence" (radio mix) – 5:43
 "Guitarman" (Jerry Reed) – 3:42

US CD single (9 40375–2)
 "Reverence" (album version) – 3:40
 "Reverence" (Jim and William Reid mix) – 5:38
 "Reverence" (Al Jourgensen mix) – 6:09
 "Reverence" (Mark Stent mix) – 6:46
 "Guitarman" – 3:42

Personnel
The Jesus and Mary Chain
 Jim Reid – vocals, guitar, production
 William Reid – guitar, production

Additional personnel
 Alan Moulder – engineering ("Reverence", "Guitarman")
 Dick Meaney – engineering ("Heat")
 Anjali Dutt – engineering (radio mix)
 Al Jourgensen – remixing (Al Jourgensen mix)
 Mark Stent – remixing (Mark Stent mix)

Charts

References

The Jesus and Mary Chain songs
1992 singles
Songs written by Jim Reid
Songs written by William Reid (musician)
1992 songs
Blanco y Negro Records singles
American Recordings (record label) singles
Songs about the assassination of John F. Kennedy
Electronic rock songs